Be is the sixth studio album by American rapper Common. It was released on May 24, 2005, by Geffen Records and GOOD Music. The album was primarily produced by rapper Kanye West, with additional production from frequent collaborator J Dilla. It debuted at number two on the US Billboard 200, with first-week sales of 185,000 copies in the United States. The album is Common's second album to sell over 500,000 copies (over 800,000 copies sold), becoming a certified gold by the Recording Industry Association of America (RIAA).

Be was also a critical success, receiving acclaim and accolades from several critics and music publications. The album received a perfect "XXL" rating from hip hop publication XXL and was deemed Common's magnum opus by HipHopGoldenAge.

Conception

Background
Be was touted as Common's comeback album after the commercially disastrous Electric Circus. His previous album lacked promotion following MCA Records's absorption under Geffen. His new alliance with Kanye West helped to spark public interest in the project, as the album was produced by West and released by his own label GOOD Music. "I met Kanye in '96…" he said. "He was still in high school. He used to come around No I.D.'s house, a guy that used to produce for me. The thing I noticed about Kanye was that he could really rap! He had some kind of hunger that I hadn't really seen before."

"He's today's Marvin Gaye of rap," West enthused on a DVD accompanying a deluxe edition of Be. "Buy the album. If you in a situation where you can barely buy groceries, burn the album."

The results show that Common was clearly aware, and perhaps agreeing, with the negative criticisms about Electric Circus. In comparison to that album, Be is lean, immediate, and commanding, yet also restrained in its musical ambitions. Many believe it to be his safest album. Of the reaction to the album, the rapper said: "I don't think Electric Circus was as focused. Though I'd done some progressive hip-hop, people know me as the b-boy. When I showed them something different, a different style of b-boy, there were like, "Hold up. You can be Afrocentric, but what's this rock shit that you're doing?" Many of the beats created by West, and which Common rejected for the project, later appeared on West's studio album Late Registration.Title
In an interview with AllHipHop, Common denied that the album title stood for "Before Erykah." Common explained the concept and the album title in a 2005 interview for SixShot.com:

Singles

"The Corner"
Common gave his reasons for featuring controversial spoken word recording artists, the Last Poets, on the album's first official single, "The Corner": "They gifted at writing. They voices is incredible. They took my song to a higher level. And that's what hip-hop was about to me. It would have a message. It would take you to the next place. It was fresh as people say -- something new. They brought newness to what "The Corner" was and they also brought some nostalgia, too. Just them being from the '70s and being used in hip-hop and their spirit brought something pure to it. They gave me a better understanding of the corner after that. I knew those who had been listening to hip-hop would know who the Last Poets were and if they didn't they would feel it in their souls sooner or later. And I also felt good about introducing some of the youth to the Last Poets."

"Go!"

"Go" was the album's second, and highest charting single. The song featured Kanye West and John Mayer, however all the verses are performed by Common with West and Mayer ad-libbing in the chorus. The video for the song included shots of Common surrounded by numerous models.

"Testify"
The album's third single, "Testify" received a type of promotional video known as a "mini-movie"; a term coined by Michael Jackson to describe a music video with a complex plot and a suitably long running time, often with intermissions between  the song's parts. The video featured acting parts from Taraji P. Henson, Bill Duke, Steve Harris and Wood Harris, and received notable spins on specialist channels such as MTV2. The song samples "Innocent Til Proven Guilty" by Honey Cone.

Critical receptionBe received widespread acclaim from critics. At Metacritic, which assigns a normalized rating out of 100 to reviews from mainstream publications, the album received an average score of 83, based on 26 reviews. Andy Kellman of AllMusic said, "Be isn't likely to be referred to by anyone as groundbreaking, but it's one of Common's best, and it's also one of the most tightly constructed albums of any form within recent memory." Andy Greenwald of Blender said, "Be picks up where West's The College Dropout left off." Raymond Fiore of Entertainment Weekly said, "Bes leanness signals awesome growth even without pushing sonic boundaries." Dorian Lynskey of The Guardian said, "Though not quite 2005's best hip-hop album - Kanye West retains that honour for himself - Be is a lean and vibrant masterclass in hip-hop fundamentals." NME said, "Gives hope to a hip-hop stuck in a mire of mediocrity."

Ryan Dombal of Pitchfork said, "The lack of instant-gratification couplets may disappoint at first, but each verse's rewarding intricacies become more evident with multiple listens." Q said, "Common's best album so far, one that proves hip hop can be both smart and mainstream." Nathan Brackett of Rolling Stone said, "West is the producer Common has been waiting for all of his career: He makes Common both catchier and edgier at the same time." Will Hermes of Spin said, "Even when the music flags, Common's remarkably hungry raps push it along." XXL gave the album its highest rating of XXL, writing, "While label support and the times heavily influence whether great music can be crowned a classic, if nothing else Common has created a flawless album. By giving us himself completely and speaking to and for us as complete people, he's birthed the total package. Common has raised the bar. Hopefully, a year from now we'll look back and see that MCs have been rhyming like Common since.

Andrew Simon of Vibe wrote that the album "gets to the root of human experience—all the while staying beautifully soulful and funky." The New York Times Kelefa Sanneh felt that Be was "certainly a triumph, but if it isn't quite the all-time classic Common was hoping for, that's because it sounds a bit too straightforward." Assigning the album a three-star honorable mention rating, Robert Christgau of The Village Voice wrote that "few of the best moments belong to the main attraction, who's not as wise as they tell him he is."

Common's lyrics on Be earned him the Lyricist of the Year award at the 2006 BET Hip Hop Awards. In 2012 Complex called the album one of the classics of the last decade.  The album was also included in the book 1001 Albums You Must Hear Before You Die.

Accolades
The information regarding accolades attributed to Be is adapted from Acclaimed Music.

Grammy nominations
Be was nominated in four categories at the 48th Grammy Awards: Best Rap Album, Best Rap Performance by a Duo or Group for "The Corner" featuring the Last Poets, Best Rap/Sung Collaboration for "They Say" featuring Kanye West and John Legend, and Best Rap Solo Performance for "Testify".

Track listing
All tracks produced by Kanye West, except where noted.Notes  signifies a co-producer.
 "The Corner", "Chi-City" and "The Food (Live)" feature background vocals by Kanye West
 "Go!" features background vocals by John Mayer and Kanye West
 "Faithful" features background vocals by John Legend and Bilal
 "Love Is..." features background vocals by Luna E of Cirius B
 "It's Your World (Part 1 & 2)" features background vocals by Bilal and Mr. Lonnie LynnSample credits' "Be (Intro)" contains a sample of "Mother Nature", written by Albert Jones.
 "The Corner" contains samples of "You Make the Sun Shine", written by Leon Moore and performed by the Temprees.
 "Go!" contains a sample of "Old Smokey", performed by Linda Lewis.
 "Faithful" contains a sample of "Faithful to the End", performed by D. J. Rogers.
 "Testify" contains a sample of "Innocent Till Proven Guilty", performed by Honey Cone.
 "Love Is..." contains a sample of "God Is Love", performed by Marvin Gaye.
 "Chi-City" contains an interpolation of "Since I Found My Baby", performed by Cornelius Brothers & Sister Rose.
 "The Food" contains samples of "I Never Had It So Good and Felt So Bad", performed by the Chi-Lites; and "Nothing Can Change This Love", performed by Sam Cooke.
 "Real People" contains a sample of "Sweet Children", written by Caesar Frazier.
 "They Say" contains samples of "Ghetto Child", performed by Ahmad Jamal.
 "It's Your World (Part 1 & 2)" contains a sample of "Share What You Got", performed by the Modulations.

Personnel
Credits for Be'' adapted from AllMusic.

 A-Trak – main personnel, scratching, turntables 
 Jason Agel – assistant engineer 
 Num Amun-Tehu – main personnel, percussion
 Bilal – guest artist, main personnel, vocals (background)
 Cass Bird – cover photo 
 Dave Chappelle – introduction 
 Common – executive producer, main personnel, primary artist, rap
 Tom Coyne – mastering 
 Darren "ROCK" Darnell – engineer 
 Andrew Dawson – engineer, mixing 
 J Dilla – audio production 
 DJ Dummy – main personnel, scratching, turntables
 Taylor Dow – assistant engineer 
 Derrick Dudley – executive producer 
 Luna E – main personnel, vocals (background)
 Francis Forde – assistant engineer
 Dawn Haynes – wardrobe 
 Frank Hendler – mixing assistant 
 Derrick Hodge – bass (acoustic), double bass, main personnel 
 Charles Hunt – engineer 

 Kids – performer, primary artist 
 Anthony Kilhoffer – engineer 
 Christian Lantry – photography 
 The Last Poets – guest artist, main personnel, primary artist, spoken word 
 John Legend – guest artist, main personnel, primary artist, vocals (background)
 Lonnie Lynn – main personnel, poetry, vocals (background)
 Mister Lonnie & the Kids Lynn – vocals (background)
 Manny Marroquin – mixing 
 Hulis Mavruk – art direction 
 John Mayer – guest artist, main personnel, vocals (background)
 Rick McRae – assistant engineer 
 Bob Power – mixing 
 James Poyser – audio production, instrumentation, keyboards, main personnel, strings, various instruments
 Karriem Riggins – drums, percussion, producer 
 Jared Robbins – mixing assistant 
 Steve Tolle – assistant engineer 
 Kanye West – audio production, executive producer, guest artist, keyboards, main personnel, primary artist, producer, vocals (background)
 Jared Zastrow – engineer

Charts

Weekly charts

Year-end charts

Certifications

References

External links
 
 
 

2005 albums
Common (rapper) albums
Albums produced by J Dilla
Albums produced by Kanye West
Geffen Records albums
GOOD Music albums